"Freedom" is a 1987 single by Alice Cooper, taken from his tenth solo studio album, Raise Your Fist and Yell. It was written by Alice Cooper and Kane Roberts.

The song was the only single released from Raise Your Fist and Yell. It did not chart in the US when released in late 1987; however, it reached #50 on the UK charts in early 1988. The single's B-side in both countries was the album track "Time to Kill".

It was Cooper's last single to be released by MCA Inc. until 1992 when Geffen Records (bought by MCA in 1990) released the Guns N' Roses song "The Garden" from Use Your Illusion I as a single, Cooper being a guest on that track.

Music video
A music video was produced to promote the single.

Personnel
Alice Cooper - vocals
Kane Roberts - guitar
Kip Winger III - bass
Paul Horowitz - keyboards
Ken K. Mary - drums

Chart positions

References

1987 singles
Songs written by Alice Cooper
Songs written by Kane Roberts
Alice Cooper songs
MCA Records singles
Glam metal songs
1987 songs